Jean-Antoine Morand (1727–1794) was an 18th-century  French architect and urban planner whose plan circulaire (circular plan) "reimagined" the city of Lyon. Morand was guillotined in 1794.

References

1727 births
1794 deaths
18th-century French architects
18th-century French painters
French people executed by guillotine during the French Revolution
People from Briançon